Nymphicula submarginalis is a moth in the family Crambidae. It was described by David John Lawrence Agassiz in 2014. It is found in Papua New Guinea, where it has been recorded from the Western and Southern highlands.

The wingspan is about 12 mm. The base of the forewings is dark fuscous with an orange antemedian band and a fuscous spot on the middle of the costa. The base of the hindwings is white with a fuscous line and a fuscous antemedian band.

Etymology
The species name refers to the subterminal markings on the hindwings.

References

Nymphicula
Moths described in 2014